Stenoma peridesma is a moth of the family Depressariidae. It is found in Amazonas, Brazil.

The wingspan is about 13 mm. The forewings are light brownish ochreous speckled grey with the costal and apical edge suffused ferruginous, the base of the costa grey. The second discal stigma is small and dark grey. The hindwings are grey.

References

Moths described in 1925
Taxa named by Edward Meyrick
Stenoma